Raja Hindustani is a 1996 Indian Hindi-language romantic drama film directed by Dharmesh Darshan. It tells the story of a cab driver from a small town who falls in love with a rich young woman. Aamir Khan and Karisma Kapoor play the lead roles. Released on 15 November 1996, the film's plot was inspired from the 1965 film Jab Jab Phool Khile, starring Shashi Kapoor and Nanda. The film's music was composed by Nadeem-Shravan, with lyrics by Sameer. It went on to win five Filmfare Awards, including the awards for Best Film and Best Actors, and seven Screen Awards.

Raja Hindustani was the third most commercially successful Hindi film of the 1990s in terms of net gross. Made on a budget of 5.75 crore, the film went on to gross 76.34 crore worldwide, becoming the highest-grossing film of the year, and the fourth highest-grossing film in India of the 1990s behind Hum Aapke Hain Koun..!, Dilwale Dulhania Le Jayenge and Kuch Kuch Hota Hai. The film's music became popular and was successful, especially in the central and eastern states of India. Karisma Kapoor was complimented for her looks and performance as Aarti: a rich, beautiful, sensitive, young woman full of dreams and desires. It is Kapoor's biggest commercial success till date and is regarded as one of her best performances; it was a major turning point in her career. She won the Filmfare Best Actress Award for her role. The chemistry between the lead pair of Aamir Khan and Karisma Kapoor was praised and there was a much talked-about kissing scene. The film was remade in Kannada as Naanu Naane in 2002, starring Upendra and Sakshi Shivanand in lead roles and in Odia as Priya Mo Priya in 2005 and was later dubbed in Telugu as Prema Bandham.

Plot 
Aarti Sehgal is a beautiful young girl. Her evil stepmother Shalini wants to gain her father Bakshrath's wealth. Aarti arrives in Palankhet for a vacation to discover memories of her late mother and hires the services of available driver, Raja Hindustani. Ultimately, they bond and fall in love after an accidental passionate romantic kiss.
Bakshrath arrives to take Aarti back to Mumbai and rejects Raja as his son-in-law, but they disobey him and marry. He later accepts their love, bringing them to Mumbai.

To gain total control of Bakshrath's assets, Shalini sets a trap that causes Raja and Aarti to get separated. Upon knowing her pregnancy, Aarti decides to inform and reunite with Raja. The doctor advises her not to travel. Shalini is asked to reach Palankhet to inform and convince Raja to come back to Mumbai. However, she misleads him that Aarti wants to divorce him, and then Aarti that Raja now hates her. Thus they get stuck in misunderstandings and separate.

6 months later
Aarti gives birth to a son, whom she dearly loves. Raja later gets to know that she has his child and is under the impression she intends to keep him away from it. Fearing he can never see his son, Raja kidnaps him. The lies and deception of Shalini come out. Distraught, Aarti reveals the truth to Raja, and they unite.

Cast 
Aamir Khan as Raja Hindustani
Karisma Kapoor as Aarti Sehgal
Suresh Oberoi as Bakshrath Sehgal
Archana Puran Singh as Shalini "Shalu" Mitra 
Tiku Talsania as Sanjeev Sharma
Farida Jalal as Suhasini Sharma
Johnny Lever as Balwant Singh
Pramod Moutho as Swaraj Mitra
Mohnish Behl as Jay Mitra
Navneet Nishan as Kamal "Kammo" Singh
Veeru Krishnan as Gulaab Singh
Master Kunal Khemu as Rajnikant
Razak Khan as Taxi Driver
Kalpana Iyer in song "Pardesi Pardesi"
Pratibha Sinha in song "Pardesi Pardesi"

Production 
Juhi Chawla was first offered the lead actress role, but she refused. Pooja Bhatt and Aishwarya Rai were also among those actresses who were considered for the role. Palankhet was a fictional location created for the film, and is a portmanteau of two real hill stations' names: Palampur and Ranikhet.

Reception

Critical response 
Film critic Anupama Chopra, while reviewing Raja Hindustani for India Today wrote, "the film is disappointingly dated, but Darshan scores with his music-catchy 'Pardesi, Pardesi'— and with his leading lady, Karisma." She went on to praise Kapoor's performance saying, "Karisma looks stunning and acts surprisingly well. She is the lifeblood of this otherwise-banal film."

Box office 
Raja Hindustani earned 76.34 crore worldwide, including a domestic gross of 73.84crore. Its domestic nett was 43.15crore, and its adjusted worldwide gross is equivalent to 394crore.

Box Office India declared it an "All-Time Blockbuster". Domestically, it was the fourth highest-grossing film of the 1990s, after Hum Aapke Hain Koun (1994) (116 crore), Dilwale Dulhaniya Le Jayenge (1995) (86.49 crore) and Kuch Kuch Hota Hai (1998) (80.12 crore). Adjusted for inflation, Raja Hindustani is the fifth highest-grossing film of India since the 1990s.

Soundtrack 

The soundtrack was composed by Nadeem-Shravan. Planet Bollywood ranks the film's soundtrack at 56 in its all-time top 100 greatest Bollywood soundtracks.

It consisted of tracks like "Kitna Pyara Tujhe Rab Ne" (which is uncredited and unofficial translation of the Punjabi song "Kinna Sohna Tenu Rab Ne Banaya" by Nusrat Fateh Ali Khan), "Aaye Ho Meri Zindagi Mein", which had become an immensely popular wedding song, and Udit Narayan and Alka Yagnik's "Pardesi Pardesi", which was a major chartbuster at the time and which also led to the film's success. Udit Narayan won his 3rd Filmfare Award for Best Male Playback Singer for this song. The album became the best-selling Bollywood soundtrack of the year by a wide margin.

Aniket Joshi of Planet Bollywood gave the album a rating of 9.5 out of 10 stating, "Raja Hindustani is a must for lovers of good ever lasting melody." The soundtrack album sold 11 million copies and is one of the best-selling Bollywood soundtrack albums of all time. It was the third best selling album of the 1990s after Aashiqui (1990) and Dil To Pagal Hai (1997).

Alka Yagnik considers "Poochho Zara Poocho" as one of the best songs she ever rendered. The song has been copied by many a composer since. Anand-Milind lifted the tune in the "Tumse Dil Lagane Ki Sazaa Hai" part of the song and used it in the song "Mausam Ki Tarah Tum Bhi Badal To Na Jaaoge" from Jaanwar (1999). Both songs were picturized on Karisma Kapoor and had in common, singer and lyricist: Alka Yagnik and Sameer. The director of the later movie is Suneel Darshan, who is an elder sibling to Dharmesh Darshan.

Again, the same portion of the song was used by Himesh Reshammiya in the "Tujhe Apna Dil Dene Ka Hai Mazaa" part of the song "Pyaar Kar" from the film Humraaz (2002).

One of the riffs used in the background score of the film was later on used by Nadeem-Shravan in the chorus of the song "Tum Dil Ki Dhadkan Mein", from the film Dhadkan (2000). Dhadkan was also directed by Dharmesh Darshan, with the movie's soundtrack composed by Nadeem-Shravan, and lyrics written by Sameer.

The song, "Saala Main To Sahab Ban Gaya", from the 1974 film Sagina, was briefly used in the movie. The song was picturised on Aamir Khan. In Sagina, the song was filmed on Dilip Kumar and sung by Kishore Kumar. In this film, Kishore Kumar's original vocals were retained.

Track list

Awards

See also 
List of highest-grossing Indian films

References

External links 
 

1990s Hindi-language films
1996 films
Films scored by Nadeem–Shravan
Films shot in Ooty
1996 romantic drama films
Hindi films remade in other languages
Indian romantic drama films
Films with screenplays by Robin Bhatt
Films scored by Surinder Sodhi
Films directed by Dharmesh Darshan